Bard Productions, based in Wellington, New Zealand, is a theatre company best known for offering site-specific and 'adventure theatre.' The company has been in operation since 2007.

Performances 

Frogs Under the Waterfront, an adaptation of Aristophanes' The Frogs, was the company's first successful site-specific production. The performance took place underneath the Wellington waterfront, with the audience in paddle boats. The company won a number of awards for the production and attracted significant local and national media attention.

Two years later the company produced Quarantine, a show about the human quarantine patients who lived and died on Matiu-Somes Island in the Wellington harbour. The audience was taken to the island at night in a chartered ferry, and the performance itself took place in the forests of the island and in an historical quarantine building.

In 2013 A Tempest off Matiu-Somes Island, an adaptation of Shakespeare's The Tempest held in a chartered ferry which took audience members to the island and in a large animal quarantine station abandoned in the 1980s.

In 2014 the company mounted a return season of "A Tempest off Matiu-Somes Island". It was made public in January 2014 that the company had joined with the New Zealand Department of Conservation and the Kaitiaki Board to secure a 10-year concession to stage theatrical events and performances on Matiu-Somes Island during the summer months.

Other Projects 

In mid-2013 the company expanded to Melbourne, Australia and opened up the corporate teambuilding and murder mystery branch of the company, CluedUp Unique Events.

References

External links 

Theatre companies in New Zealand
New Zealand-centric
2007 establishments in New Zealand